MAREA is a 6,605km (4,104 miles) long transatlantic communications cable connecting the United States with Spain. Owned and funded by Microsoft and Meta Platforms, but constructed and operated by Telxius, a subsidiary of the Spanish telecom company Telefónica, it is the "highest-capacity submarine cable in the world" with a system design capacity of 200 terabits per second as of 2019.

History 
In May 2016, Microsoft, Facebook (Now Meta Platforms), and Telxius announced the MAREA project, saying that it would provide the Eastern United States, most of whose internet traffic flows through New York, with "a more efficient path not only to Europe but to Africa, the Middle East, and even Asia". According to Microsoft's Director of Global Network Strategy for Cloud Infrastructure and Operations, one impetus for the project was sparked by the service disruptions caused by Hurricane Sandy in October 2012.

Construction began shortly afterwards, in August 2016, and was completed in September 2017, connecting Virginia Beach, Virginia, in the United States, with Sopelana, a town near Bilbao, Spain. It began operations in February 2018.

In January 2019, Telxius announced that AWS had signed an IRU agreement to use one of MAREA's eight fiber pairs (Microsoft and Facebook each own two pairs, and Telxius will have three pairs for other customers and its own use.

Operation  
Telxius was responsible for the construction and operation of the cable, which connects Virginia Beach, Virginia, in the United States, with Sopelana, Spain (near Bilbao).

The cable was initially expected to have a transmission speed of 160 terabits per second. (Specifically, 8 fiber pairs * 25 DWDM channels * 400 Gbit/s per single carrier (16-QAM modulation) = 160 Tbit/s). But in 2019, a research team reported they had generated signaling speeds of 26.2 Tbit/s (per fiber pair) on MAREA cable, 20 percent higher than believed feasible when the cable was designed.
 

The cable weighs approximately 4.65 million kilograms, and is composed of eight pairs of fiber-optic cable bundles.

The term "marea" means "tide" in Spanish.

See also 
 Dark fibre
 Submarine communications cable
 Transatlantic communications cable

References

Transatlantic communications cables
Submarine communications cables in the North Atlantic Ocean
Infrastructure completed in 2018
2018 establishments in Spain
2018 establishments in Virginia